The 18th New York City Marathon took place on Sunday 1 November.

Results

Men

Women

References

External links

New York City
Marathon
New York City Marathon
New York City Marathon